Webster University Leiden is an American university with campuses around the world, including the Netherlands.  Webster University provides both undergraduate (BA/BS) and graduate (MA/MBA) education. Webster University is accredited in the Netherlands through NVAO and in the USA through The Higher Learning Commission's North Central Association.

History 
The university was established in 1915 in Webster Groves, a suburb of St. Louis, by the Sisters of Loretto. Initially the name of the school was Loretto College, and admission was restricted to women only.  It was one of the first Catholic women's universities west of the Mississippi.  The first male students were admitted in 1962. The Sisters of Loretto transferred the university to a Board of Directors in 1967.

The mascot of the university is the Gorlok. This mythical creature was created in 1984 by students. It is said that the Gorlok has "paws of a cheetah, horns of a buffalo, and the face of the Saint-Bernard dog."

Locations 
Webster University has many national locations in the United States, many of them on military bases and metropolitan campuses.  Webster University also has many international campuses:  Geneva, Vienna, Leiden, London, Shanghai and Cha-am (Thailand).

The Netherlands 
Since 1983 Webster University has also had a campus in the Netherlands. There is a campus in Leiden, as well as an MBA location in Amsterdam (World Trade Center). The main campus building is housed at Boommarkt 1 in Leiden. This building has heritage status rijksmonument.

Since 1983 Webster University has offered undergraduate (BA/BS) and graduate (MA/MBA) education following the American Liberal Arts philosophy. The Dutch branch of Webster University offers management, (international), media, art, psychology and international relations.

Webster University Leiden has approximately 400 registered students across more than 50 different nationalities.  The alumni network is more than 2,500 strong.

Accreditation 
Webster University established the Leiden campus in 1983.  Webster University is accredited in the USA by the Higher Learning Commission's North Central Association. In 2008, Webster University in Leiden was recognized through the Dutch ministry of education (OCW) as an institution of higher education.  At the same time the Bachelor of International Business and Management Studies (IBMS) and the Applied Behavioral and Social Sciences (ABSS) were accredited through the NVAO.

External links
Website University Leiden
Webster University worldwide

Universities in the Netherlands
Webster University